Auchmuty is a surname. Notable people with the surname include:
James Auchmuty (1909–1981), Irish-born historian
John Auchmuty (fl. 18th century), Irish Christian cleric
Richard T. Auchmuty (1831–1893), American soldier, architect, and philanthropist
Samuel Auchmuty (British Army officer) (1758–1822), American-born British Army general
Samuel Benjamin Auchmuty (1780–1868), Irish-born general of the British Army
John Auchmoutie, Scottish courtier.

Scottish surnames